Hybomitra hirta is an Asian species of horse fly in the family Tabanidae.

Distribution
India.

References

Tabanidae
Diptera of Asia
Taxa named by Francis Walker (entomologist)
Insects described in 1850